Mohamed Said Pasha (19 January 1863 - 1928), was Prime Minister of Egypt from 1910 to 1914, and again in 1919. He was born in Alexandria to a family of Turkish origin. He was the father of the artist Mahmoud Sa'id and grandfather of Queen Farida of Egypt.

References

1863 births
1928 deaths
20th-century prime ministers of Egypt
Prime Ministers of Egypt
Egyptian people of Turkish descent
Egyptian pashas
Honorary Knights Grand Cross of the Order of St Michael and St George